Alcalus baluensis is a species of frog in the family Ceratobatrachidae. It is endemic to northern and western Borneo. Its common name is Balu eastern frog or dwarf mountain frog. It was placed in the family Dicroglossidae before being transferred to Ceratobatrachidae in 2015.

Description
Alcalus baluensis are small but stocky frogs. They typically measure  in snout–vent length. Tympanic ring is visible.

Habitat and conservation
Its natural habitats are lowland and mid-elevation primary rainforests. It occurs on the forest floor in leaf litter and along stream banks. It is threatened by habitat loss.

References

baluensis
Endemic fauna of Borneo
Amphibians of Brunei
Amphibians of Indonesia
Amphibians of Malaysia
Amphibians described in 1896
Taxa named by George Albert Boulenger
Taxonomy articles created by Polbot
Amphibians of Borneo